Andrey Konstantinovich Vorontsevich (born July 17, 1987) is a Russian professional basketball player for the Russian team UNICS Kazan of the VTB United League. He plays at the power forward position.

Professional career
Vorontsevich made his professional debut with Lokomotiv Novosibirsk during the 2005–06 season. He moved to CSKA Moscow, before the 2006–07 season. He was named the Best Russian Young Player, in 2007. In his 8th season with CSKA, he started all of the team's 30 EuroLeague games. In the 2014–15 season, he was named the VTB United League Defensive Player of the Year, and the VTB United League Playoffs MVP.

On July 1, 2020, after 14 seasons, Vorontsevich and CSKA parted ways.

On March 3, 2021, he signed with Nizhny Novgorod of the VTB United League.

On July 9, 2021, he signed with the Russian team UNICS Kazan.

National team career

Russian junior national team
Vorontsevich was a member of the junior national teams of Russia. With Russia's junior teams, he played at the 2006 FIBA Europe Under-20 Championship, and at the 2007 FIBA Europe Under-20 Championship.

Russian senior national team
Vorontsevich has been a member of the senior Russian national basketball team. With Russia's senior national team, he played at the 2008 Summer Olympics, the EuroBasket 2009, the 2010 FIBA World Championship, the EuroBasket 2015, and the EuroBasket 2017. He also won a bronze medal at the EuroBasket 2011.

Career statistics

EuroLeague

|-
| style="text-align:left;"| 2006–07
| style="text-align:left;" rowspan=15| CSKA Moscow
| 6 || 0 || 3.0 || .250 || .000 || 1.000 || .3 || .0 || .0 || .0 || .5 || -.8
|-
| style="text-align:left;background:#AFE6BA;"| 2007–08†
| 9 || 0 || 10.1 || .500 || .333 || .750 || 1.8 || .0 || .1 || .3 || 2.7 || 2.7
|-
| style="text-align:left;"| 2008–09
| 6 || 0 || 2.8 || .500 || 1.000 || .000 || .7 || .0 || .0 || .0 || 1.2 || .6
|-
| style="text-align:left;"| 2009–10
| 20 || 1 || 12.7 || .460 || .310 || .793 || 2.1 || .6 || .4 || .2 || 5.0 || 5.2
|-
| style="text-align:left;"| 2010–11
| 10 || 4 || 23.9 || .550 || .571 || .692 || 4.3 || 1.1 || .6 || .4 || 10.5 || 11.0
|-
| style="text-align:left;"| 2011–12
| 20 || 2 || 16.3 || .459|| .327 || .636 || 2.7 || 1.0 || .5 || .4 || 5.8 || 5.9
|-
| style="text-align:left;"| 2012–13
| 16 || 1 || 12.0 || .548 || .417 || .929 || 3.6 || .4 || .4 || .1 || 4.0 || 6.5
|-
| style="text-align:left;"| 2013–14
| 25 || 7 || 15.7 || .513 || .400 || .818 || 3.1 || 1.0 || .4 || .2 || 4.6 || 6.5
|-
| style="text-align:left;"| 2014–15
| 30 || 30 || 25.7 || .447 || .370 || .760 || 5.7 || 2.2 || .6 || .9 || 8.4 || 11.9
|-
| style="text-align:left;background:#AFE6BA;"| 2015–16†
| 28|| 23 || 24.3 || .447 || .445 || .686 || 4.2 || 1.4 || .8 || .6 || 8.5 || 9.4
|-
| style="text-align:left;"| 2016–17
| 35 || 21 || 19.5 || .506 || .477 || .520 || 2.9 || .9 || .5 || .1 || 7.3 || 7.3
|-
| style="text-align:left;"| 2017–18
| 30 || 9 || 15.0 || .448 || .397 || .786 || 2.4 || .7 || .2 || .5 || 4.7 || 4.9
|-
| style="text-align:left;background:#AFE6BA;"| 2018–19†
| 19 || 4 || 10.3 || .155 || .303 || 1.000 || 1.6 || .7 || .3 || .1 || 2.2 || 2.1
|-
| style="text-align:left;"| 2019–20
| 20 || 3 || 13.3 || .469 || .286 || .500 || 3.0 || .1 || .5 || .2 || 3.6 || 4.0
|- class="sortbottom"
| style="text-align:center;"|Career
| 235 || 83 || 17.5 || .476 || .416 || .734 || 3.2 || 1.0 || .5 || .4 || 6.0 || 7.0

References

External links

Andrey Vorontsevich at cskabasket.com
Andrey Vorontsevich at eurobasket.com
Andrey Vorontsevich at euroleague.net
Andrey Vorontsevich at fiba.com

1987 births
Living people
2010 FIBA World Championship players
2019 FIBA Basketball World Cup players
Basketball players at the 2008 Summer Olympics
BC UNICS players
Olympic basketball players of Russia
PBC CSKA Moscow players
Power forwards (basketball)
Russian men's basketball players
Sportspeople from Omsk